The Ireland national under-19 cricket team represents All-Ireland in under-19 international cricket.

Ireland has qualified for the Under-19 Cricket World Cup on eight occasions, most recently in 2018. This is the most of any European country outside England. Ireland's best result came at the 2010 World Cup in New Zealand, where they finished tenth.

History
Ireland won the 2009 ICC Under-19 Cricket World Cup Qualifier which was held in Canada. The team gained victories over the U-19 teams of Hong Kong, Canada, Uganda, Sierra Leone, Vanuatu, the Netherlands and Afghanistan.

The team lost only one match to the United States. Ireland's performance in this tournament gained them qualification for the 2010 ICC Under-19 Cricket World Cup.

Among other ICC full members, Ireland has beaten only Afghanistan (once) and Zimbabwe (twice) at the Under-19 World Cup. At the time of their victories over Zimbabwe, Ireland was an associate member.

Ireland was added to the 2016 Under-19 Cricket World Cup on 6 January 2016, after Australian under-19s withdrew due to security concerns. They announced their squad two days later.

Under-19 World Cup record

Records
All records listed are for under-19 One Day International (ODI) matches only.

Team records

Highest totals
 329/9 (50 overs), v. , at Chattogram, 23 February 2004
 304/9 (50 overs), v. , at Colombo, 14 February 2006
 291/9 (50 overs), v. , at Chattogram, 29 February 2004
 288/6 (50 overs), v. , at Lincoln, 27 January 2018
 278/8 (50 overs), v. , at Lincoln, 23 January 2018

Lowest totals
 65 (24.2 overs), v. , at Queenstown, 17 January 2010
 71 (27.5 overs), v. , at Crab Hill, 30 December 2021
 78 (30 overs), v. , at Kurunegala, 23 January 2000
 97 (29.1 overs), v. , at Colombo, 5 February 2006
 97 (28.5 overs), v. , at Whangarei, 16 January 2018

Individual records

Most career runs
 606 – Eoin Morgan (2004-2006)
 318 – Gary Wilson (2004-2006)
 296 – Paul Stirling (2008-2010)
 249 – Harry Tector (2016-2018)
 241 – Kevin O'Brien (2004)

Highest individual scores
 124 (126 balls) – Eoin Morgan, v.  at Colombo, 14 February 2006
 117 (129 balls) – Eoin Morgan, v. , at Chattogram, 23 February 2004
 114 (102 balls) – Paul Stirling, v. , at Queenstown, 19 January 2010
 111* (113 balls) – Josh Cox, v. , at Georgetown, 15 January 2022
 101 (113 balls) – Harry Tector, v. , at Lincoln, 27 January 2018

Most career wickets
 27 – Greg Thompson (2004-2008)
 20 – Matthew Humphreys (2021-2022)
 18 – Dwayne McGerrigle (1998-2000)
 16 – Gary Kidd (2004-2006)
 15 – George Dockrell (2010-2012), James Hall (2006-2008)

Best bowling performances
 6/50 (9.4 overs) – Niall McDarby, v. , at Colombo, 8 February 2006
 5/16 (10 overs) – Keith Spelman, v. , at Johannesburg, 19 January 1998
 5/20 (7.4 overs) – Muzamil Sherzad, v. , at Port-of-Spain, 29 January 2022
 5/21 (6.4 overs) – Reuben Wilson, v. , at Cave Hill, 2 January 2022
 5/26 (10 overs) – Dwayne McGerrigle, v. , at Boksburg, 12 January 1998

References

External links
 Ireland at Cricinfo
 2010 Under-19 Cricket World Cup squads

1998 establishments in Ireland
Under-19 cricket teams
Under-19
Cricket clubs established in 1998
C